Solarization refers to a phenomenon in physics where a material undergoes a temporary change in color after being subjected to high-energy electromagnetic radiation, such as ultraviolet light or X-rays. Clear glass and many plastics will turn amber, green or other colors when subjected to X-radiation, and glass may turn blue after long-term solar exposure in the desert. It is believed that solarization is caused by the formation of internal defects, called color centers, which selectively absorb portions of the visible light spectrum. In glass, color center absorption can often be reversed by heating the glass to high temperatures (a process called thermal bleaching) to restore the glass to its initial transparent state. Solarization may also permanently degrade a material's physical or mechanical properties, and is one of the mechanisms involved in the breakdown of plastics within the environment.

See also 
Photodegradation

Atomic, molecular, and optical physics
Chromism